Abroscelis maino is a species of tiger beetle in the genus Abroscelis.

References

Cicindelidae